Synchita is a genus of cylindrical bark beetles in the family Zopheridae. There are about 20 described species in Synchita. The genus was first described in 1792 by Johann Christian Ludwig Hellwig.

Species
These species belong to the genus Synchita:

 Synchita amoena (Fairmaire, 1850)
 Synchita dubia Hinton
 Synchita exilis (Grouvelle, 1898)
 Synchita fallax Schuh, 1998
 Synchita floridana Casey
 Synchita fuliginosa Melsheimer, 1846
 Synchita grouvellei
 Synchita humeralis (Fabricius, 1792)
 Synchita lecontei
 Synchita mediolanensis A.Villa & G.B.Villa, 1833
 Synchita multimaculata (Grouvelle, 1902
 Synchita nigripennis LeConte, 1863
 Synchita obscura Horn 1885
 Synchita parvula Guérin-Méneville 1844
 Synchita picta Erichson, 1845
 Synchita pauxilla (Pascoe, 1863
 Synchita separanda (Reitter, 1882)
 Synchita striatopunctata (Guérin-Méneville 1844)
 Synchita undata Guérin-Méneville, 1844
 Synchita variegata Hellwig, 1792

References

Further reading

External links

 

Zopheridae
Articles created by Qbugbot